Throughout its history, the German automotive company Volkswagen has applied myriad advertising methods.

History
In 1949, William Bernbach, along with colleagues, Ned Doyle and Maxwell Dane, formed Doyle Dane Bernbach (DDB), the Manhattan advertising agency that would create the revolutionary Volkswagen ad campaigns of the 1950s and 1960s.

Bernbach's artistic approach to print advertising was innovative, and he understood that advertising did not sell products. The strategy was to keep customers by creating and nurturing them as brand ambassadors, rather than attempting to attract the attention of those who were uninterested in the product. Bernbach's team of "agency creatives" was headed by Bob Gage, who hired Helmut Krone, as an art director in 1954. Krone owned a Volkswagen before the agency pitched for the account. Krone, Bernbach and the first copywriter on the account, Julian Koenig, were impressed with the "honesty" of the car. Krone was an intellectual among art directors—seeking ways to lay out an ad campaign to stand-in for the product itself. He took the simple, straightforward layouts of agency principal David Ogilvy of Ogilvy and Mather and adapted them for Volkswagen. Krone's repeated use of black-and-white, largely unretouched photographs for Volkswagen (as opposed to the embellished illustrations used traditionally by competing agencies), coupled with Bob Gage's bold work for Ohrbach's, spawned consistently witty and unique print ads that met DDB's goal of making a stark departure from existing advertisement techniques.

The corporate headquarters and factory that produced Volkswagens was located in Wolfsburg, Germany. Because Volkswagen's advertising budget in 1960 was only $800,000, DDB’s bare-bones, black-and-white approach, coupled with a projected common theme of irreverence and humor, fit Wolfsburg's needs well. Each Volkswagen ad was designed to be so complete that it could stand alone as a viable advertisement, even without addressing all aspects of the automobile.

Taken as a sign of the campaign's runaway success, research by the Starch Company showed that these Volkswagen advertisements had higher reader scores than editorial pieces in many publications, noting that Volkswagen advertisements often did not even include a slogan and had a very subdued logo. (Krone did not believe in logos, and there is some evidence that their inclusion followed a disagreement with the client.)  The Volkswagen series of advertisements (which included the 1959 "Think Small" ad) were voted the No. 1 campaign of all time in Advertising Ages 1999 The Century of Advertising.

Following the success of "Think Small", the advertisement titled "Lemon" left a lasting legacy in America—use of the word "Lemon" to describe poor quality cars. "Lemon" campaign introduced a famous tagline "We pluck the lemons, you get the plums."

Fahrvergnügen
Fahrvergnügen was an advertising slogan used by the German automobile manufacturer Volkswagen in a 1990 U.S. ad campaign that included a stick figure driving a Volkswagen car.The word was coined by Urs Baur, a young Swiss Art Director, working at DDB Needham at the time, in response to Chairman Emeritus DBB Worldwide Keith Reinhard's search for a word to express the unique feeling one would experience driving a Volkswagen. Volkswagens at the time were technologically inferior to most of their key competitors, both in features and reliability, but owners consistently expressed an emotional connection to the VW brand. After launch of the campaign the word took off, crossing over into popular culture where it was widely parodied, including by late night hosts like David Letterman, in cartoons like Doonesbury, and by followers of the Grateful Dead, who created the popular "Fukengrüven" bumper sticker. The campaign was widely credited as a turnaround for Volkswagen sales in the US, and it saved the account for DDB Needham before this historic agency - client relationship finally came to an end a few years later.

"Fahrvergnügen" means "driving enjoyment" (from fahren, "to drive," and Vergnügen, "enjoyment"). The term itself is not standard German but a neologism (compound noun) created especially for this advertising campaign. One of the tag lines incorporating the word was: "Fahrvergnügen: It's what makes a car a Volkswagen".

In popular culture

In episode 3, Season 1 of Mad Men, "Marriage of Figaro", Don Draper and his associates discuss the "Lemon" advertisement at the beginning of the day. Draper is not amused at the ad but nevertheless concedes that it has retained their attention despite appearing in a copy of Playboy. Roger Sterling, his associate, scoffs. Sterling acknowledges the role Volkswagen will play in Germany's new industrialization initiative.

In season 13, episode 7 of Top Gear, hosts Jeremy Clarkson and James May were tasked with creating a commercial for Volkswagen's new Scirocco diesel in the style of Volkswagen's advertising. The hosts created numerous ads, including a remake of the famous Volkswagen "The Man" commercial. However, none of them were approved by the Volkswagen ad men because of the ads featuring explosions, gore, and speed.

See also
Changes
Lemon (automobile)
Think Small
VDub

References and sources
 References

 Sources

Further reading
 Marcantonio, Alfredo & David Abbott. "Remember those great Volkswagen ads?"  London: Booth-Clibborn Editions, 1993. 
 Imseng, Dominik. Think small: The story of the world's greatest ad. Full Stop Press, 2011. 

 
Advertising campaigns